Annapolis East was a provincial electoral district in Nova Scotia, Canada, that elected one member of the Nova Scotia House of Assembly and existed from 1956 to 1993. It was created by a division of the former district of Annapolis County into Annapolis East and Annapolis West. Annapolis East included the towns of Bridgetown and Middleton. On the recommendations of the 1992 Electoral Boundaries Commission, the district was abolished and merged into Digby-Annapolis.

Members of the Legislative Assembly
Annapolis East elected the following members to the Legislative Assembly:

Election results

1956 general election

1960 general election

1963 general election

1967 general election

1970 general election

1974 general election

1978 general election

1981 general election

1984 general election

1988 general election

References

Former provincial electoral districts of Nova Scotia